City University, or CU, is a private university in Dhaka, Bangladesh. It was established in 2002. The language of instruction of City University is English. The university offers undergraduate and master's degrees in the fields of business administration, mechanical engineering, computer science and engineering, textile engineering, electrical & electronics engineering, civil engineering, pharmacy, agriculture, law, English, etc.

History 
The university was founded in 2002 in the Blue Ocean Tower, with the approval of the University Grants Commission (Bangladesh) and the Government of Bangladesh's Ministry of Education. City University got the Permanent Certificate (Permanent Sanad) from Ministry of Education, Government of the People's Republic of Bangladesh on 23 October 2013.

The university started with the Department of Computer Science and Engineering and School of Business where they offered a Bachelor of Science and Engineering (CSE), Masters and Bachelor of Business Administration (MBA and BBA) and later grew with the addition of Department of English, Textiles Engineering and Mechanical Engineering, civil engineering, pharmacy, agriculture with the approval of the University Grants Commission.

Since 2002, City University had eight thousand students.

Campuses 
The university has multiple campuses within Dhaka.

Permanent campus
The permanent campus is in Ashulia, Savar, in Dhaka District. City University started its permanent campus in 2011 with a huge area of land covered with green trees and grass, referred to as "the green campus". All classrooms are totally digitalized and have projectors. The laboratory is up-to-date. City University has a large playground for playing different types of games and has a large hall room for all types of official and cultural occasions.

City campus
The city campus is located in Panthapath, near Bashundhara City. Its previous campus was in Banani, Dhaka, Bangladesh. The campus relocated on 1 November 2014 in Panthapath near Bashundhara City to a modernized building. The new campus has a large cafeteria, a smart car parking system, and a large conference room. All classrooms are totally digitalized with projectors. The laboratory is up-to-date.

Library 
The library has comprehensive collections to meet the needs of its users and is located in two campuses, one is in the main campus at Khagan, Birulia, Savar, Dhaka and the other one is at the city campus in Panthapath, Dhaka. The library provides services designed to support students, faculty members, researchers, and staff members. All members are encouraged to examine, consult, borrow and browse through any book, journal, printed/non-printed materials, on-line resources, and receive other services of the library.

Academic semesters

Four month semester
 Fall   : January to April
 Spring : May to August
 Summer : September to December

Six month semester
 Spring : January to June
 Fall   : July to December

Academics program 
 Bachelor of Computer Science & Engineering  (BCSE)
 Bachelor of Science in Mechanical Engineering (BSME)
 Bachelor of Science in Textile Engineering (BSTE)
 Bachelor of Science in Electrical and Electronics Engineering (EEE)
 Bachelor of Science in Civil Engineering (CE)
 Bachelor of Science in Agriculture (Hon's)
 Bachelor of Pharmacy
 Bachelor of Business Administration (BBA)
 Bachelor of Arts in English
 LL.B. (Hons)
 LL.B (Pass)
 Bachelor Social Science
 Bachelor of Nursing
 Master of Laws (LL.M.)
 MBA REGULAR
 Executive MBA
 MA in English

Faculties and departments
The university consists of 4 Faculties and 10 Departments.

1. Faculty of Science & Engineering
 Department of Computer Science & Engineering
 Department of Science in Mechanical Engineering
 Department of Science in Textile Engineering
 Department of Science in Electrical and Electronics Engineering
 Department of Science in Civil Engineering
 Department of Pharmacy

2. Faculty of Business & Economics
 Department of Business Administration

3. Faculty of Arts & Social Science
 Department of English
 Department of Law

4. Faculty of Agriculture
 Department of Agriculture

In addition to academic work, opportunities for co-curricular and extracurricular activities abound for students & mdash; the objective being to help students to develop all-rounded personalities. The university has a range of students clubs to promote activities in different areas.

Publications 

The university publishes two journals: Alok Bicchuron and AloKon.

Vice chancellor and Chairman
The current vice chancellor is Shah-E-Alam.

List of Vice Chancellors 
 Shah-E-Alam (20xx–Present)

List of Chairman 
 Alhaz Moqbul Hossain (20xx– 24 May 2020)

 Ahasanul Islam Titu (25 May 2020 – present)

Halls of residence
 Fazlur Rahman Hall
 Mockbul Hossain Hall

Halls for girls
 Mona Hossain Hall
 Fatema Hall

References

External links 
 

Educational institutions established in 2002
Private universities in Bangladesh
2002 establishments in Bangladesh
Universities and colleges in Dhaka